Naomi Muscha (born November 18, 1953) is an American politician who served in the North Dakota House of Representatives from the 24th district from 2012 to 2016.

References

1953 births
Living people
Democratic Party members of the North Dakota House of Representatives